Karen Lynn Portch (born 5 June 1959) is an Antiguan and Barbudan sailor. She competed in the Europe event at the 1992 Summer Olympics.

References

1959 births
Living people
Antigua and Barbuda female sailors (sport)
Olympic sailors of Antigua and Barbuda
Sailors at the 1992 Summer Olympics – Europe
Place of birth missing (living people)